Hohenau is a city & district of the Itapúa Department, Paraguay, located 8 kilometers away from Trinidad and 365 kilometers away from Asunción. It has extensive cultivation fields and streams nearby like the Capi'ivary, Poromocó, Mansisovy, Santa María and others.

Name
The name comes from its elevated position sloping slightly downhill to the Paraná river, from the German hoch 'high' and Au(e) 'floodplain'.

History

The city was founded on March 14, 1900 by Carlos Reverchon, Guillermo Closs, Ambrosio Scholler and Esteban Scholler, helped by German colonists.
Founder Wilhelm (Guillermo) Closs, who was of German descent, was born on 31 October 1841 in Baumschneis, Brazil (today's Dois Irmãos). Closs established a place called "Serra Pelada" in the state of Río Grande do Sul. Later, he decided to move to Paraguay, where he met Hohenau's future co-founder Reverchon. Together, they drafted plans for a massive wave of German immigrants to settle in the region.

Aided by the Austrian consul to Paraguay, they successfully persuaded the government to allow for the construction of a colony. By a decree dated September 12, 1898, the Paraguayan government gave Closs and Reverchon a share of 16 square leagues in the then Alto Paraná, Encarnación Department.

On March 14, 1900, the first settlers arrived from Encarnación. In August 1900, the arrival of 8 more families (a total of 55 people) set the stage for mass migration to the colony. Some of these first families were the Dresslers, Kuschels, Fritzes, Jachows, and others.

These families faced many problems, such as disease, scarcity of resources, and a lack of communication, which were gradually overcome. The town's status was elevated to an official district in 1944.

In the 1930s and '40s, the colony began to attract many non-Germans, such as Poles, Ukrainians, and Russians, and to a lesser degree Belgians and French. Later, in 1958, a large wave of Japanese arrived. These settlers then went on to found the district of La Paz.

Geography
The city is 220 square kilometers in area. It is bordered on the north and the east by the Obligado district, on the south by the Trinidad district, and on the west by the Jesús, La Paz, and San Pedro del Paraná districts.

It is located in a zone rich in hydrographic resources, with the Paraná river and the Capi'ivary stream.

Climate
The climate is sub-tropical, ideal for agriculture, with temperatures ranging from 3-4 °C in winter to 37-38 °C in summer.

Demography
Hohenau has a total population of 7,987 inhabitants.

Economy

The inhabitants are mainly focused on agriculture, specifically on the cultivation of soy, cotton, corn, manioc, yerba mate, tung, sorgo, citric, bean, peanut, and watermelon, and the stock breeding of cows, pigs and poultry.

There are also some small industries including flour mills, yerba mate mills, wineries, brick factories, bakeries, saw-mills, carpentry shops, and starch factories.

According to the General Directorate of Statistics, Polls, and Census, the Hohenau district has the second-highest living standard in Paraguay, behind the capital, Asunción.

Tourism
An important tourist attraction is the Alto Paraná Hunting and Fishing Club, where traditional dorado fishing takes place.

Among the other attractions this city offers are the German and Japanese colonies, where visitors can see unique architectural characteristics, typical foods, and cultivated fields.

Hohenau can be reached by the Ruta Sexta Doctor Juan León Mallorquín, a road that crosses the urban center of the city and connects it with the cities of Encarnación and Ciudad del Este. A network of local roads connects Hohenau with other places in the surrounding area.

Institutions
The city has a dance school, culinary arts academy, tailoring academy, barber academy, and other institutions that teach computer science and typewriting.

Medical institutions in the city include SOS Aldea de Niños, founded August 21, 1971 on land donated by the German Association of Hohenau with 17 buildings housing 160 children; the Mother and Child Hospital; the SOS Hospital with 40 beds and 2500 monthly consultations; and the Adventist Clinic that started its medical assistance service to the district and the department in 1963.

Neighborhoods
Center:
San José
San Blás
Cerro Corá
CONAVI
Primavera
Obrero
Santa Lucía

Rural zone:
Hohenau 1 (Puerto Hohenau)
Hohenau 2 (Centro Urbano)
Hohenau 3 (Campo Ángel)
Hohenau 4 (Caguarené)
Hohenau 5 (Santa María)

Notable residents
Nazi war criminal Dr. Josef Mengele lived in hiding in Hohenau between 1959 and 1960.

References

 Reportaje al País. Tomo 1. Edición 2001. Asunción Paraguay.
 Geografía Ilustrada del Paraguay -  - Distribuidora Arami S.R.L.
 La Magia de nuestra tierra. Fundación en Alianza. Asunción. 2007.

External links
 Government Official Website
 Official Tourist Information Website
 SENATUR
World Gazeteer: Paraguay – World-Gazetteer.com

Districts of Itapúa Department
Populated places established in 1900